Kumuyi is a Yoruba surname. Notable people with the surname include:

Abiodun Kumuyi, Nigerian editor, wife of William
William Kumuyi (born 1941), Nigerian evangelist 

Yoruba-language surnames